Ramdas Gangaram Kadam (born 23 July 1953) is an Indian politician from Maharashtra. He was Member of the Legislative Assembly from Khed Vidhan Sabha constituency of Ratnagiri District, Maharashtra, India as a member of Shiv Sena (Eknath Shinde ). He has been elected consecutively for 4 terms in the Maharashtra Legislative Assembly for 1990, 1995, 1999 and 2004.
He got elected to Maharashtra Legislative Council from Shiv Sena Party in Jan. 2010.
He was Cabinet Minister of Environment in Maharashtra State Government and guardian minister of Nanded district.

Positions held
 1990: Elected to Maharashtra Legislative Assembly (1st term)
 1995: Re-Elected to Maharashtra Legislative Assembly (2nd term)
 1999: Re-Elected to Maharashtra Legislative Assembly (3rd term)
 2004: Re-Elected to Maharashtra Legislative Assembly (4th term)
 2005-2009: Leader of the Opposition in the Maharashtra Legislative Assembly
 2005 Onwards: Leader, Shiv Sena 
 2010: Elected to Maharashtra Legislative Council (1st term)
 2014: Cabinet Minister of Environment in Maharashtra State Government
 2014-2018: Guardian minister of Aurangabad
 2015: Re-elected to Maharashtra Legislative Council (2nd term)
 2014-2018: Appointed Guardian minister of Nanded district

See also
 Narayan Rane ministry
 Devendra Fadnavis ministry
 Yogesh Kadam

References

External links
 Shivsena website
 http://articles.economictimes.indiatimes.com/2014-12-06/news/56779809_1_shiv-sena-water-resources-ramdas-kadam
 http://www.dnaindia.com/mumbai/report-maharashtra-cm-devendra-fadnavis-team-portfolios-allocated-bjp-retains-key-departments-2041510

Marathi politicians
Maharashtra MLAs 1990–1995
Maharashtra MLAs 1995–1999
Maharashtra MLAs 1999–2004
Maharashtra MLAs 2004–2009
Members of the Maharashtra Legislative Council
Shiv Sena politicians
Living people
Leaders of the Opposition in the Maharashtra Legislative Assembly
State cabinet ministers of Maharashtra
1963 births
Far-right politicians in India